The Mormon Pioneer Cemetery is located at 3300 State Street in present-day Florence at the north end of Omaha, Nebraska. The Cemetery is the burial site of hundreds of Mormon pioneers who lived in Winter Quarters, a temporary settlement that lasted from 1846 to 1848 as the settlers moved to Salt Lake City, Utah. It was designated a landmark by the City of Omaha in 1990.

Records of the Church of Jesus Christ of Latter-day Saints (LDS Church) indicate that 359 Mormon pioneers were buried at the site. Remnants of three of the graves are visible today, uncovered during the erection of a commemorative monument in 1936. The monument, a bronze statue by Salt Lake City artist Avard Fairbanks, depicts parents who have committed the body of an infant to the grave.

The graves of a number of Florence residents are also located in the cemetery. The community of Florence began to use the cemetery several years after the departure of the Mormons and prior to the Mormons the area had been used as an Indian burial ground.

With the exception of a commemorative marker in the nearby city park, the cemetery is the only visible reminder of the Mormon settlement.

See also

 History of North Omaha, Nebraska
 List of cemeteries in Omaha

References

External links

 
 Mormon Pioneer Cemetery on the Waymarking website.
 Mormon Trail Center at Historic Winter Quarters
 

Cemeteries in Omaha, Nebraska
Mormon cemeteries
Landmarks in North Omaha, Nebraska
Mormon pioneers
Mormon Trail
Omaha Landmarks
Tourist attractions in Omaha, Nebraska
Latter Day Saint movement in Nebraska
1846 establishments in Indian Territory